Aquatic plants native to  Minnesota:

Algae
Chara
Filamentous algae
Phytoplankton
Stonewort

Emergent plants
Bulrushes
Cattails
Flowering rush Invasive aquatic plant
Purple loosestrife Invasive aquatic plant
Wild rice

Floating-leaf plants
Duckweed and watermeal
Spatterdock
Swamp smartweed
Watershield
White water lily
Yellow lotus

Submerged plants
Broad-leaf pondweeds
Bushy pondweeds and naiads
Canada waterweed
Coontail
Curly-leaf pondweed Invasive aquatic plant
Eurasian watermilfoil Invasive aquatic plant
Narrow-leaf pondweeds
Northern watermilfoil
Wild celery

See also
List of Minnesota rivers
List of lakes in Minnesota
List of invasive species in North America

Aquatic plants
.Minnesota
.Minnesota
Minnesota aquatic